Siphocampylus scandens is a species of plant in the family Campanulaceae. It is endemic to Ecuador and its natural habitat is subtropical or tropical moist montane forests. It is threatened by habitat loss.

References

Flora of Ecuador
scandens
Least concern plants
Taxonomy articles created by Polbot